Bread and Roses was an all-acoustic rock band from Boston, Massachusetts known for their intimate, unamplified DIY-venue performances and crowd singalongs.  Their style included influences from early country, bluegrass, Irish traditional, and old-timey genres, as well as punk rock.  Interspersed with their own original songs were renditions of union ballads, traditional labor songs, and covers of American folk music and country classics.  Their lyrics included potent messages of anti-World War I politics and union worker rights, as well as tales of sailors, whalers and the seafaring life of pirates.

History
Bread and Roses started as an offshoot of the lead singer Morgan Coe's previous band, The High-Steppin' Nickel Kids.  Its earliest formation was a 3-piece (electric guitar, electric bass, drums) showing a heavy Gang of Four influence, with elements of ska and slow-punk.  When the bass player and drummer dropped out, Coe went for a simple, acoustic sound (see: early Against Me!)  He traded his guitar for an upright bass, and added a bluegrass ensemble.  From 2007 onward, the Bread and Roses lineup consisted of Morgan on double bass and lead vocals, Adam Haut on fiddle and vocals, Nate on mandolin, Steve Fornier on guitar, dobro, harmonica, and vocals, Dan Pond on acoustic guitar and tin whistle, Whitney on banjo and acoustic guitar and Dan Wilder on drums.

In their final amalgamation, Bread and Roses were known for their rowdy and enjoyable live performances.  They toured with Yoni Gordon and played shows with Mischief Brew, The Can Kickers, The Pine Hill Haints, Tomorrow The Gallows, and many other similar bands.  Boats, backyards and basements were their preferred performance spaces but they also played in more conventional venues such as The Lily Pad in Cambridge, MA and AS220 in Providence, RI.  Their tours took them far north as the Electric Tractor in Montreal, QC.

Bread and Roses' releases include a couple of early demos, a self-produced CD-R, various 4-song EPs, a 7" split with Mischief Brew called "Loved But Unrespected," and a full-length album titled "Deep River Day" out on Fistolo Records.   "Songbooks of the War" was slated for release as an LP in 2009 but unfortunately it was canceled due to legal issues with the band name, which eventually led to a breakup.

As of June 2009 Bread and Roses was no longer active as a band.  They released the following statement:

We regret to announce that after some 5+ years of existence, we are closing our doors. This was not an easy decision to make, and we deeply appreciate all the bands and musicians who have played with and inspired us, anyone who's ever set up a show so we could show up late and forget our setlist, and all the people who have made us welcome on their floors, in their basements, and in their yards. Being (in) this band has been an honor and a huge learning experience for all of us, both musically and personally, and we will do our best to chisel away at that debt through our future endeavors. 
On a tangentially related note, we suggest that anyone with time on their hands contact the "Bread And Roses Benefit Agency" of San Francisco and urge them to change their name to a song quote more suited to their post-hippie worldview; perhaps something from "The Preacher And The Slave."

Discography
 Loved But Unrespected 7" split with Mischief Brew - 2006, Fistolo Records
 Deep River Day LP - 2007, Fistolo Records
 Songbooks of the War LP - 2009, unreleased

References

External links
Bread & Roses on MySpace
Bread & Roses on The Live Music Archive
Bread & Roses on Last.fm
Bread & Roses on StereoKiller
Fistolo Records on MySpace
Interpunk Records

Folk punk groups
Musical groups from Boston
Punk rock groups from Massachusetts